Erlend Flornes Skaret (born 9 August 1976) is a Norwegian novelist.

He hails from Bremnes. Publishing on Samlaget, he issued the novels Wroclaw (2011) and Lucida (2013), and then the novel Nomade on Samleren. Wroclaw was set in Wrocław and was reviewed in several newspapers. Lucida was partially set in Spain, and reviewed in slightly fewer newspapers.

References

1976 births
Living people
People from Bømlo
Norwegian novelists
Nynorsk-language writers